"Try Everything" is a song recorded by Colombian singer Shakira for the 2016 Walt Disney Animation Studios film Zootopia, and written by Sia, Tor Hermansen, and Mikkel Eriksen.

In the film, it is featured as a song recorded by a singer named Gazelle (voiced by Shakira). It is first heard when Judy Hopps plays it on her MP3 player on the train to Zootopia. It is heard again during the end credits (performed by Gazelle for the citizens of Zootopia). The song appears on the soundtrack album to Zootopia, and was released as a single in February 2016.

Commercial performance
The song debuted and peaked at number 63 on the Billboard Hot 100, as well as number 26 on the Digital Songs chart with the help of 33,000 digital downloads and three million US streams after the release of its official music video. The song was certified 2 times platinum in the United States by RIAA for sales exceeding 2,000,000 units, it also received a gold certification in the United Kingdom by BPI for sales of over 400,000 units.

Critical reception
The song was nominated for Best Song Written For Visual Media at the 59th Grammy Awards.
In 2020 Billboard named "Try Everything" as one of the 12 best Disney songs of the 21st century. In 2022, the song ranked 19th on the Billboard’s Greatest of All Time Disney Songs Chart. 
In the UK, the song ranked 25th on the list of Disney's Official most-streamed songs as of 2022.

Music video 
The music video consists mostly of scenes from Zootopia, intercut with footage of Shakira singing in a recording studio.

Accolades

International version 
As the track is a background song, not key for the understanding of the plot, "Try Everything" was left untranslated in most foreign dubbings. However, it numbers a few adaptations around the world.

Other versions
In April 2016, the five man a cappella group Home Free released a music video of their cover of the song.
As of November 2021, the video had over 8.5 million views on YouTube.

In November 2020, the South Korean girl group Purple Kiss covered the song as part of their international medley of covers of the top female vocalist from each country.

Charts

Year-end charts

Sales and certifications

References

2016 songs
Shakira songs
Songs written for animated films
Songs written by Sia (musician)
Songs written by Mikkel Storleer Eriksen
Songs written by Tor Erik Hermansen
Disney songs
Walt Disney Records singles
2016 singles
Song recordings produced by Stargate (record producers)
2010s ballads
Zootopia (franchise)